Kimiko Hahn (born July 5, 1955) is an American poet and distinguished professor in the MFA program of Queens College, CUNY. Her works frequently deal with the reinvention of poetic forms and the intersecting of conflicting identities.

Biography
Hahn was born in Mount Kisco, New York on July 5, 1955. Her parents are both artists. Her mother, Maude Miyako Hamai, was a Japanese American from Maui, Hawaii; her father, Walter Hahn, was a German American from Wisconsin. They met in Chicago, where Walter was a friend of the notable African American author Ralph Ellison. Her sister is Tomie Hahn, a performer and ethnologist.

Hahn grew up in Pleasantville, New York, and between 1964 and 1965,  the Hahns later lived in Tokyo, Japan. As a teen, she became involved in the New York City Asian American movement of the 1970s. Zhou Xiaojing has commented that her racially mixed background influenced "her profound understanding of the politics of the body" as seen in her poetry (113). In the U.S., her Asian appearance made some schoolmates "called her Chinese or Japanese, never regarding her as an American like them. Yet when she went to Japan … her schoolmates [there] called her American or 'gaijin'" (113).
 
Hahn received a bachelor's degree in English and East Asian Studies from the University of Iowa and an M.A. in Japanese Literature from Columbia University. She is a distinguished professor at Queens College, CUNY and has also taught at New York University, Sarah Lawrence College, and University of Houston.

Hahn has two daughters, Miyako Tess (b. 1987) and Reiko Lily (b. 1990), from her second marriage to Ted Hannan. She has been married to true crime writer Harold Schechter since 2002.

Poetry works
The major themes of Hahn's poetry explores Asian American female desire and subjectivity. The judges' citation from the Pen/Voelcker Award noted: "With wild courage Kimiko Hahn's poems voyage fearlessly into explorations of love, sexuality, motherhood, violence, and grief and the way gender inscribes us."

Her poetry draws from feminist works of Hélène Cixous, Luce Irigaray, and Adrienne Rich, more canonical American poets such as T.S. Eliot and William Carlos Williams poetic experimentations, as well as Japanese culture and literature. The title of The Narrow Road to the Interior (W.W. Norton, 2006), for instance, is drawn from Bashō's Oku no Hosomichi.  In an interview with Laurie Sheck for Bomb, Hahn discussed how she combines a variety of genres in her work, including Japanese forms, such as zuihitsu  in her poetry collection, The Narrow Road to the Interior: "The Japanese view it [zuihitsu]as a distinct genre, although its elements are difficult to pin down. There's no Western equivalent, though some people might wish to categorize it as a prose poem or an essay. You mentioned some of its characteristics: a kind of randomness that is not really random, but a feeling of randomness; a pointed subjectivity that we don't normally associate with the essay. The zuihitsu can also resemble other Western forms: lists, journals. I've added emails to the mix. Fake emails....The technique of collage is really compelling to me. Letter writing, diary form—real and invented—I like to use within the zuihitsu itself."

Her poems were first published in We Stand Our Ground: Three Women, Their Vision, Their Poems, which she co-created with Gale Jackson and Susan Sherman. Since then, she has authored multiple collections of poetry, including Toxic Flora  (2010), The Narrow Road to the Interior (2006), The Artist's Daughter (2002), Mosquito and Ant (1999), Volatile (1998), The Unbearable Heart (1995), and Earshot (1992).

The latter, Earshot, received the Theodore Roethke Memorial Poetry Prize and an Association of Asian American Studies Literature Award. In 1996, her poem "Possession: A Zuihitsu" (originally published in Another Chicago Magazine) was included in the anthology the Best American Poetry, and The Unbearable Heart received an American Book Award. Other honors for her work include the Lila Wallace–Reader's Digest Writer's Award, the Shelley Memorial Prize, and the PEN/Voelcker Award. She has received fellowships from the National Endowment for the Arts, Guggenheim Foundation, and the New York Foundation for the Arts.

Aside from poetry, Hahn has written for film such as the 1995 two-hour HBO special, "Ain't Nuthin' But a She-Thing" (for which she also recorded the voice-overs); and most recently, a text for "Everywhere at Once," Holly Fisher's film based on Peter Lindbergh's still photos and narrated by Jeanne Moreau.  The latter premiered at the 2007 Cannes Film Festival and presented at the 2008 Tribeca Film Festival.

Bibliography

Poetry
 Air Pocket. Hanging Loose Press, 1989. 
 Earshot. Hanging Loose Press, 1992. 
 The Unbearable Heart. Kaya Press, 1995. 
 
 Volatile. Hanging Loose Press, 1999. 
 Pine. 1999
 Mosquito and Ant: Poems. W.W. Norton, 1999. 
 The Artist's Daughter: Poems W.W. Norton, 2002. 
 The Narrow Road to the Interior: Poems.  W.W. Norton, 2006. 
 "A Field Guide to the Intractable: Zuihitsu."  Small Anchor Press chapbook, 2009.
 Toxic Flora: Poems. W.W. Norton, 2010.  
 
 
 Brain Fever.  W.W. Norton, 2014. 
 (Write It!) Wells College Press, 2019.
 Foreign Bodies. W. W. Norton, 2020. 

Selected broadsides
 Walt Whitman Circle. 2015.
 3/3: Volume 1, Issue 1. with Lauren Henken. 2013.
With Gale Jackson and Susan Sherman
 We Stand Our Ground: Three Women, Their Vision, Their Poems. Ikon, Inc., 1988.

Prose
"Memory, Language, and Desire." Asian Americans: Collages of Identities: Proceedings of Cornell Symposium of Asian America, Issues of Identity. Ed. Lee C. Lee. Cornell University Press, 1992. 64-69. OCLC 34909762
"Afterbirth." Charlie Chan Is Dead: An Anthology of Contemporary Asian America Fiction. Ed. and intro. Jessica Hagedorn. Penguin Books, 1993.

Interviews
"Kimiko Hahn: Expressing Self and Desire, Even If One Must Writhe." By Eileen Tabios. Black Lightning: Poetry-In-Progress. New York: Asian American Writers' Workshop. 1998. 
 "Kimiko Hahn." By Laurie Sheck. Bomb 96 (Summer 2006)

Awards
 2008 PEN/Voelcker Award for Poetry.
 2008 American Book Award
 Association of Asian America Studies Literature Award
 Lila Wallace-Reader's Digest Award
 Theodore Roethke Memorial Poetry Prize
 Shelley Memorial Award from the Poetry Society of America
 The National Endowment for the Arts fellowships
 N.Y. Foundation for the Arts fellowships
 2010 Guggenheim Fellow

See also

List of Asian American writers

References

Critical studies 
Kimiko Hahn's 'Interlingual Poetics' in Mosquito and Ant By: Grotjohn, Robert. pp. 219–34 IN: Lim, Shirley Geok-lin (ed.); Gamber, John Blair (ed.); Sohn, Stephen Hong (ed.); Valentino, Gina (ed.); Transnational Asian American Literature: Sites and Transits. Philadelphia, PA: Temple UP; 2006. viii, 306 pp. (book article)
Two Hat Softeners 'In the Trade Confession': John Yau and Kimiko Hahn By: Zhou, Xiaojing. pp. 168–89 IN: Zhou, Xiaojing (ed. and introd.); Najmi, Samina (ed.); Form and Transformation in Asian American Literature. Seattle, WA: U of Washington P; 2005. 296 pp. (book article)
'I Cannot Find Her': The Oriental Feminine, Racial Melancholia, and Kimiko Hahn's The Unbearable Heart By: Chang, Juliana; Meridians: Feminism, Race, Transnationalism, 2004; 4 (2): 239-60. (journal article)
Mixing Aesthetics. A Poet's Cityscape: Kimiko Hahn By: Schlote, Christiane. pp. 541–59 IN: Alonso Gallo, Laura P. (ed. and introd.); Voces de América/American Voices: Entrevistas a escritores americanos/Interviews with American Writers. Cádiz, Spain: Aduana Vieja; 2004. 730 pp. (book article)
Pulse and Impulse: The Zuihitsu By: Hahn, Kimiko. pp. 75–82 IN: Dienstfrey, Patricia (ed.); Hillman, Brenda (ed.); DuPlessis, Rachel Blau (foreword); The Grand Permission: New Writings on Poetics and Motherhood. Middletown, CT: Wesleyan UP; 2003. xxvi, 278 pp. (book article)
Luce Irigaray's Choreography with Sex and Race By: Mori, Kaori; Dissertation Abstracts International, Section A: The Humanities and Social Sciences, 2002 July; 63 (1): 189. State U of New York, Buffalo, 2002. (dissertation abstract)
To Adore a Fragment: An Interview with Kimiko Hahn By: Kalamaras, George; Bloomsbury Review, 1999 Mar-Apr; 19 (2): 13-14. (journal article)
Breaking from Tradition: Experimental Poems by Four Contemporary Asian American Women Poets By: Xiaojing, Zhou; Revista Canaria de Estudios Ingleses, 1998 Nov; 37: 199-218. (journal article)
Huang, Guiyou and Emmanuel Sampath Nelson, eds. Asian-American Poets: A Bio-Bibliographical Critical Sourcebook. Greenwood Publishing Group. 2002. 113-9. 
Hara, Marie and Nora Okja Keller, eds. Intersecting Circles: The Voices of Hapa Women in Poetry and Prose. Baboo Ridge Press, 1999 
Wallinger-Schorn, Brigitte."Appendix: Interviews: Interviews with Kimiko Hahn." "So There it Is": An Exploration of Cultural Hybridity in Contemporary Asian American Poetry. Rodopi, 2011. 249-291.

External links
 Audio: Kimiko Hahn reads "Sparrow" from the book The Narrow Road to the Interior
 Audio: Kimiko Hahn reads "Cope's Rule" from the book Toxic Flora
 Heath Anthology author site
 Kimiko Hahn in conversation with Emily Moore at Loggernaut.  Fall 2006.
 Kimiko Hahn interviewed by Laurie Sheck: BOMB Magazine
 The Poetry of Science Interview in the New York Times TierneyLab Blog, July 14, 2009.
 "Kimiko Hahn." The Poetry Center at Smith College
"From The Narrow Road to the Interior by Kimiko Hahn," Reading Between A&B
 "A Conversation with Kimiko Hahn." Interviewed by Wendy Chin-Tanner. Lantern Review Blog: Asian American Poetry Unbounded. 19 December 2011

Poems online
"The Waiting Room," "Residue of God," atlengthmag
 "Alba", "Allure", "Awareness", and "My Very Exciting Magic Carpet Just Sailed Under Nine Palace Elephants," Cerise Press 1.3 (Spring 2010)
 “Raptor,” “The Apiculturalist," Kenyon Review 
 “Just Walk Away Renee,” “A Meditation on Magnetic Fields,” Clementine Magazine
 ”Phantosmia,” “Sedna,” “The Soul,” Storyscape Online Journal 4 October 2009
 "Cope's Rule," "Nepenthe," "Magpie Lark," ''PEN 2008 
 “Bumble Bees,” On Earth + podcast “The Fever,” New Yorker 27 August 2007
 “The Light,” New Yorker 06 May 2002
 “The Dilemma of Closure (August 8–10)”  Storyscape Online Journal “Design,”  Storyscape Online Journal "Like Lavrinia," Verse Daily "The Line,"  "The Breast's Syllabics," and "Becoming the Mother,"  Cross X Connect 9.3.3 (March 1998)
"The Line," Kimiko Hahn Poetry"Reckless Sonnet #7," "Things That Make Me Cry Instantly," and "Gowanus, Late Summer (2000)," Poetry Center at Smith College
 "In Childhood" Poem Hunter"Wellfleet, Midsummer (2000") and Excerpt from "Sparrow," Reading Between A&B''

1955 births
American people of German descent
American poets
American poets of Asian descent
American writers of Japanese descent
Columbia Graduate School of Arts and Sciences alumni
Queens College, City University of New York faculty
Living people
University of Iowa alumni
American women poets
People from Mount Kisco, New York
People from Pleasantville, New York
American Book Award winners
20th-century American poets
21st-century American poets
20th-century American women writers
21st-century American women writers
American women writers of Asian descent